Italy competed at the 2000 Summer Olympics in Sydney, Australia. 361 competitors, 246 men and 115 women, took part in 175 events in 29 sports.

Medalists

Archery

The men's team, which returned two members of the bronze medal-winning 1996 squad, did even better in 2000. They defeated the United States in the semifinal to guarantee themselves at least a silver medal. The Korean men, however, ensured that the Italians did not win the gold medal by defeating them in the final.

Men

Women

Athletics

Men's track

Men's field

Women's track

Women's field

Combined events
Women's heptathlon

Baseball

Italy was one of the four nations for which the third Olympic baseball tournament continued their streak of unbroken appearances. The Italians went 2–5 in the preliminary round, defeating the Netherlands and South Africa. This put them in sixth place and eliminated them from competition.

Basketball

Men's 
Team roster
 Alessandro Abbio
 Gianluca Basile
 Roberto Chiacig
 Marcelo Dilglay Damiao
 Gregor Fučka
 Giacomo Galanda
 Agostino Antonio Li Vecchi
 Denis Marconato
 Andrea Meneghin
 Michele Mian
 Carlton Myers
 German Claudio Scarone

Beach volleyball

Boxing

Canoeing

Slalom

Sprint

Cycling

Cross country

Road cycling

Road race

Road time trial

Track cycling
Points race

Keirin

Pursuit

Diving

Men

Women

Equestrian

Dressage

Eventing

Show jumping

Fencing

17 fencers, 12 men and 5 women, represented Italy in 2000.
Men

Women

Football

Men's team competition
Team roster

 ( 1.) Morgan De Sanctis
 ( 2.) Alessandro Grandoni
 ( 3.) Luca Mezzano
 ( 4.) Marco Zanchi
 ( 5.) Matteo Ferrari
 ( 6.) Gennaro Gattuso
 ( 7.) Gianni Comandini
 ( 8.) Roberto Baronio
 ( 9.) Nicola Ventola
 (10.) Andrea Pirlo
 (11.) Gianluca Zambrotta
 (12.) Massimo Margiotta
 (13.) Massimo Ambrosini
 (14.) Claudio Rivalta
 (15.) Bruno Cirillo
 (16.) Ighli Vannucchi
 (17.) Cristiano Zanetti
 (18.) Christian Abbiati
 (19.) Gennaro Scarlato
 (20.) Stefano Morrone
 (21.) Fabio Firmani
 (22.) Cristiano Lupatelli

Group stage

Quarter-finals

Gymnastics

Men

Women 
Team

Individual

Judo

Men

Women

Modern pentathlon

Rhythmic gymnastics

Individual

Team

Rowing

27 Italian rowers, all male, competed.

Sailing

Italy competed in ten of the sailing events at the 2000 Sydney Olympics and won two medals.
Men

Women

Open events

Shooting

Men

Women

Softball

Team roster
 Marta Gambella
 Daniela Castellani
 Susan Bugliarello
 Francesca Francolini
 Nicole Di Salvio
 Verusca Paternoster
 Giovanna Palermi
 Jie Hua
 Clelia Ailara
 Sabrina Comberlato
 Claudia Petracchi
 Loredana Auletta
 Yue-Fen Sun
 Alessandra Gorla
 Marina Cergol

Results

Swimming

Men

Women

Synchronized swimming

Taekwondo

Tennis

Triathlon

Volleyball

Men's team competition
Team roster
 Marco Bracci
 Mirko Corsano
 Alessandro Fei
 Andrea Gardini
 Andrea Giani
 Pasquale Gravina
 Luigi Mastrangelo
 Marco Meoni
 Samuele Papi
 Simone Rosalba
 Andrea Sartoretti
 Paolo Tofoli
 Nyembo Mwarabu
 Head coach: Andrea Anastasi

Results

Women's team competition
Team roster
 Sabrina Bertini
 Antonella Bragaglia
 Maurizia Cacciatori
 Ana Paula de Tassis
 Manuela Leggeri
 Eleonora Lo Bianco
 Anna Vania Mello
 Darina Mifkova
 Paola Paggi
 Francesca Piccinini
 Simona Rinieri
 Elisa Togut
 Head coach: Angelo Frigoni

Results

Water polo

Team roster
 Alberto Angelini
 Francesco Attolico
 Fabio Bencivenga
 Leonardo Binchi
 Alberto Ghibellini
 Amedeo Pomilio
 Francesco Postilgione
 Carlo Silipo
 Leonardo Sottani
 Stefano Tempesti
 Antonio Vittorioso

Summary

Weightlifting

Men

Wrestling

Greco-Roman

See also
Italy at the 2000 Summer Paralympics

Sources

 Wallechinsky, David (2004). The Complete Book of the Summer Olympics (Athens 2004 Edition). Toronto, Canada. .
 International Olympic Committee (2001). The Results. Retrieved 12 November 2005.
 Sydney Organising Committee for the Olympic Games (2001). Official Report of the XXVII Olympiad Volume 1: Preparing for the Games. Retrieved 20 November 2005.
 Sydney Organising Committee for the Olympic Games (2001). Official Report of the XXVII Olympiad Volume 2: Celebrating the Games. Retrieved 20 November 2005.
 Sydney Organising Committee for the Olympic Games (2001). The Results. Retrieved 20 November 2005.
 International Olympic Committee Web Site

References

External links
 

Nations at the 2000 Summer Olympics
2000 Summer Olympics
Olympics